Sarjam Rural District is a rural district (dehestan) in Ahmadabad District, Mashhad County, Razavi Khorasan province, Iran. At the 2006 census, its population was 32,844, in 8,402 families.  The rural district has 30 villages.

References 

Rural Districts of Razavi Khorasan Province
Mashhad County